Bingham Farms is a village in  Oakland County in the U.S. state of Michigan. As of the 2020 census, the population was 1,124.  The village is located within Southfield Township.

History
Originally settled in 1823 by John Daniels of Rutland, Vermont, the tiny settlement in what was soon to become Southfield Township in 1830 would stay isolated and small until Telegraph Road was brought through the area in 1928.  In the early 1950s, citizens in the southern part of the township sought to have the entire township incorporated as a city.  Seeking to retain their individual characters and guard against annexation, the settlements in the northern end raced to incorporate as villages.  Bingham Farms was incorporated on October 4, 1955, named after a prominent family present in the village since 1880.  All roads in the village remained unpaved until 1984 to discourage intensive development.

Geography

Demographics

2010 census
As of the census of 2010, there were 1,111 people, 527 households, and 332 families living in the village. The racial makeup of the village was 85.2% White, 7.6% African American, 0.2% Native American, 4.4% Asian, 0.7% from other races, and 1.9% from two or more races. Hispanic or Latino of any race were 0.9% of the population.

There were 527 households, of which 16.1% had children under the age of 18 living with them, 58.1% were married couples living together, 3.4% had a female householder with no husband present, 1.5% had a male householder with no wife present, and 37.0% were non-families. 33.4% of all households were made up of individuals, and 24.1% had someone living alone who was 65 years of age or older. The average household size was 2.11 and the average family size was 2.67.

The median age in the village was 59.7 years. 15.2% of residents were under the age of 18; 2.7% were between the ages of 18 and 24; 9.8% were from 25 to 44; 33.1% were from 45 to 64; and 39.1% were 65 years of age or older. The gender makeup of the village was 47.3% male and 52.7% female.

2000 census
As of the census of 2000, there were 1,030 people, 445 households, and 339 families living in the village. The racial makeup of the village was 91.46% White, 5.44% African American, 1.46% Asian, 0.19% from other races, and 1.46% from two or more races. Hispanic or Latino of any race were 0.49% of the population.

There were 445 households, out of which 19.6% had children under the age of 18 living with them, 71.0% were married couples living together, 3.1% had a female householder with no husband present, and 23.6% were non-families. 20.7% of all households were made up of individuals, and 11.9% had someone living alone who was 65 years of age or older.  The average household size was 2.31 and the average family size was 2.65.

In the village, the population was spread out, with 15.9% under the age of 18, 2.9% from 18 to 24, 16.0% from 25 to 44, 36.6% from 45 to 64, and 28.5% who were 65 years of age or older.  The median age was 53 years. For every 100 females, there were 100.0 males.  For every 100 females age 18 and over, there were 92.4 males.

The median income for a household in the village was $123,771, and the median income for a family was $138,806. Males had a median income of $100,000 versus $55,556 for females. The per capita income for the village was $74,588.  None of the families and 0.9% of the population were living below the poverty line, including no under eighteens and none of those over 64.

Education
Students are zoned to the Birmingham City School District. Bingham Farms Elementary School is in Bingham Farms.

The French School of Detroit (FSD) holds its middle school classes at Berkshire Middle School in neighboring Beverly Hills. Bingham Farms Elementary School provides classes for FSD elementary school students.

Business
The Bingham Farms Office District extends from the east side of Telegraph Road, comprising a mix of two and four-storey buildings. Businesses include the headquarters of Global Commercial Credit.

References

External links

Village of Bingham Farms

Villages in Oakland County, Michigan
Villages in Michigan
Metro Detroit
Populated places established in 1955
1955 establishments in Michigan